The close-mid back unrounded vowel, or high-mid back unrounded vowel, is a type of vowel sound, used in some spoken languages. This symbol is distinct from the symbol for the voiced velar fricative, which has a descender, but some texts use this symbol for the voiced velar fricative.

The symbol was ultimately revised to be , "ram's horns", with a rounded top, in order to better differentiate it from the Latin gamma .

Unicode provides , but in some fonts this character may appear as a "baby gamma" instead.

Features

Occurrence

See also
 Index of phonetics articles

Notes

References

External links
 

Close-mid vowels
Back vowels
Unrounded vowels